A Man Could Get Killed is a 1966 American adventure comedy film directed by Ronald Neame and Cliff Owen, shot on various locations in Portugal and starring James Garner, Melina Mercouri, Sandra Dee, Anthony Franciosa, and Robert Coote. Filmed scenes with Jenny Agutter, then 14, did not appear in the final cut.

The screenplay was written by Richard L. Breen, and T. E. B. Clarke and David E. Walker based on Walker's novel 'Diamonds for Moscow' (American title 'Diamonds for Danger') published in 1956. The film introduced the melody of "Strangers in the Night" by German composer Bert Kaempfert, which won the Golden Globe Award for "Best Original Song in a Motion Picture" of 1967.

Plot
A search is on for stolen diamonds and a government agent has been killed trying to recover them. When an unsuspecting William Beddoes arrives in Lisbon on behalf of an American bank, he is mistaken for the dead agent's replacement.

Hatton-Jones of the British embassy comes to Beddoes' aid. Also taking an interest is Aurora Celeste, the dead man's lover, as well as Steve Antonio, a smuggler, who is being pursued by Amy Franklin (a woman who, as a young girl, had a crush on him).

All of the above end up aboard a yacht belonging to Dr. Mathieson, who appears to be the mastermind of the crime but doesn't know where the hidden diamonds are. Beddoes ends up engineering an escape for all and the gems wind up safely in the hands of Hatton-Jones,  the dead agent's actual successor.

Beddoes books a flight for home, assuming he will never see any of these people again, but Aurora steals his passport so that he cannot leave.

Cast
 James Garner as William Beddoes
 Melina Mercouri as Aurora Celeste
 Sandra Dee as Amy Franklin
 Tony Franciosa as Steve Antonio
 Robert Coote as Hatton-Jones
 Roland Culver as Dr. Mathieson
 Grégoire Aslan as Florian
 Cecil Parker as Sir Huntley Frazier
 Dulcie Gray as Mrs. Mathieson
 Martin Benson as Politanu
 Peter Illing as Zarik
 Niall MacGinnis as Ship's Captain
 Virgilio Teixeira as Inspector Rodrigues
 Isabel Dean as Miss Bannister
 Daniele Vargas as Osman
 Ann Firbank as Miss Nolan
 John Bartha as Ludmar

Production
The cast had a falling out with director Cliff Owen who was replaced by Ronald Neame in July 1965.  Neame recalled that co-stars James Garner and Tony Franciosa did not get on well and their fight in the film became a real brawl.

Garner calls the film "disappointing" although he says he enjoyed playing backgammon with Melina Mercouri and her husband Jules Dassin. He did admit to punching Tony Franciosa, claiming it was because he "kept abusing the stunt men" and would not pull his punches in fight scenes.

It was the last film Sandra Dee made under contract to Universal. According to a 1965 interview with the actress, she "begged [the producers] not to make [her] do the picture. So I spent a miserable four months in Lisbon, little fishing villages and in Rome, making a picture that should have taken eight weeks. We had two changes of directors, and I ended up playing Come September all over again."

Soundtrack 
The score for A Man Could Get Killed was composed by the German Bert Kaempfert, with the assistance of Herbert Rehbein, and recorded under the musical direction of Universal's Joseph Gershenson. It introduced the melody of the song "Strangers in the Night", which was initially to be sung by Melina Mercouri, but she insisted that her voice would not fit to the melody and it should be given to a man. Eventually, the version by Frank Sinatra became a global number one hit and by now is considered a standard of easy listening music. The tune, listed in the original sound track as "Beddy Bye", permeates the movie and won the Golden Globe Award for "Best Original Song in a Motion Picture" of 1967, beating the other nominated compositions "Un homme et une femme" by French orchestra leader Francis Lai, "Born Free" by John Barry, which won the 1966 Academy Award for Best Original Song, "Alfie" by Burt Bacharach, and  "Georgy Girl" by Tom Springfield, from the eponymous movies, the latter two also having been Oscar nominees in 1966.

The overall score to the movie, often resorting to Latin and even seemingly Greek influenced imagery, had a more mixed reception. The soundtrack LP - in fact a rerecording of the score - was produced by Milt Gabler and recorded at Polydor Studios, Hamburg, Germany. It was originally released on an LP by Decca (Decca DL 74750) and on a CD in 1999 by Taragon Records, then combined with Bert Kaempfert's LP Strangers in the Night (original release 1966, Decca DL 74795).

References

External links
 
 
 James Garner  interview on the Charlie Rose Show
 James Garner interview at Archive of American Television
 [https://openlibrary.org/books/OL19705551M/Diamonds_for_Moscow/
 [https://openlibrary.org/books/OL6137593M/Diamonds_for_danger/

1966 films
Films directed by Ronald Neame
Films set in Portugal
Films shot in Portugal
1960s spy comedy films
1966 comedy films